Cavern of Sirens (1997) is the second collaborative album by the American ambient musicians Steve Roach and Vidna Obmana.

Reception 
AllMusic rated the album a 4 of 5, stating "this CD is essential".

Track listing

Personnel 
 Steve Roach, Vidna Obmana – composer, performer, producer, recorder
 Sam Rosenthal – design
 Roger King – mastering
 Martine Verhoeven – cover photography
 Vidna Obmana – recorder
 Steve Roach – recorder, mixing

Notes 
 Source material recorded at Serenity Studio, Belgium and the Timeroom, Tucson, Arizona between 1995 and 1996.
 Final performance and recording at the Timeroom in October 1996, mixed November 1996.
 Thupten Nyandak, Pema Lama and director of the Dip Tse-Chok-Ling Monastery, Dharamsala, India.
 Tibetan Buddhist Chant on "Ascension For Protection" recorded at the Timeroom in November 1995.

References

External links 
 Cavern of Sirens at Discogs

1997 albums
Steve Roach (musician) albums
Projekt Records albums